Byas (also spelt Vyas, Vyans and Byans) is a rural municipality located in Darchula District of Sudurpashchim Province of Nepal.

The rural municipality is divided into total 6 wards.

Byas is derived from Vyasa, the one who classified the Vedas. It is said that the Great Sage Vyasa meditated at this place, giving the region its name.

History
The rural municipality was established on 10 March 2017, fulfilling the requirement of the new constitution of Nepal in 2015, all old municipalities and villages (which were more than 3900 in number) were restructured into 753 new units, thus this RM came into existence.

Byans, Rapla, Sunsera, Dhaulakot and Huti Village development committees were incorporated to form this new rural municipality. The headquarters of the municipality is situated at Sunsera

Byas was a part of Doti Kingdom during the medieval era. The area between Seti River to Kali river was the Doti Kingdom. In 1790 Gorkha Kingdom (Name changed as "Nepal" in 1768) fought a war against Doti Kingdom and won the battle. thus Doti Kingdom became part of Nepal.

Until 1962, Byas was a thum (county) of Baitadi-Dadeldhura district. Baitadi-Dadeldhura district was divided into two sub-districts. Baitadi and Dadeldhura. Byas was one of eight county (thum) of Baitadi sub-district.

It became part of Darchula District in 1962 when four counties of Baitadi sub-district separately formed a new district.

Ward Division
Byans RM is divided into 6 wards as below:

Ward No.3 (Sina) was created taking some area from previous village development committees Sunsera and Dhaulakot

See also
Apihimal
Duhun
Marma
Naugad

References

External links
 Village development committees marked on OpenStreetMap: Byas, Rapla, Sunsera, Dhaulakot, and Huti

Darchula District
Rural municipalities in Darchula District
Rural municipalities of Nepal established in 2017